Group B of the 1996 Fed Cup Americas Zone Group II was one of two pools in the Americas Zone Group II of the 1996 Fed Cup. Six teams competed in a round robin competition, with the teams coming first advancing to Group I in 1997.

Cuba vs. Trinidad and Tobago

Dominican Republic vs. Bermuda

Costa Rica vs. Jamaica

Peru vs. Bermuda

Cuba vs. Costa Rica

Dominican Republic vs. Trinidad and Tobago

Peru vs. Cuba

Dominican Republic vs. Jamaica

Costa Rica vs. Jamaica

Peru vs. Trinidad and Tobago

Cuba vs. Jamaica

Costa Rica vs. Bermuda

Peru vs. Costa Rica

Cuba vs. Dominican Republic

Jamaica vs. Bermuda

 Gill Butterfield, who with played for Bermuda in the doubles rubber with Kelly Holland, holds the Fed Cup record for the oldest player at 52 years and 162 days.

Peru vs. Jamaica

Dominican Republic vs. Costa Rica

Trinidad and Tobago vs. Bermuda

Peru vs. Dominican Republic

Cuba vs. Bermuda

Trinidad and Tobago vs. Jamaica

  placed first in the pool, and thus advanced to Group I in 1997, where they placed second in their pool of five.

See also
Fed Cup structure

References

External links
 Fed Cup website

1996 Fed Cup Americas Zone